Waka music is a popular Islamic-oriented Yoruba musical genre. It was made popular by Alhaja Batile Alake from Ijebu, who took the genre into the mainstream Nigerian music by playing it at concerts and parties; also, she was the first waka singer to record an album. Later, younger singers like Salawa Abeni and Kuburatu Alaragbo joined the pack. In 1992, Salawa Abeni was crowned "Queen of Waka" by the Alafin of Oyo, Oba Lamidi Adeyemi.

Waka music has no connection whatsoever with the official song of the 2010 FIFA World Cup called Waka Waka (This Time for Africa)  which is a traditional African soldiers' song from Cameroon.

References

Nigerian music
Yoruba music
Islamic music